Cedar Township is a township in Washington County, Iowa, USA.

History
Cedar Township was formed in 1844. This was the same year that the first school house in the Cedar Township was built.

References

Townships in Washington County, Iowa
Townships in Iowa
1844 establishments in Iowa Territory